The discography of American heavy metal band Black Label Society consists of 11 studio albums, two live albums, three compilation albums, four video albums, two extended plays and 23 singles.

Albums

Studio albums

Live albums

Compilation albums

Video albums

Extended plays

Singles

Music videos

References

External links
 
 
 

Heavy metal group discographies
Discographies of American artists